Kirrwiller (Alsatian: Kìrrwiller) is a commune in the Bas-Rhin département in Grand Est in north-eastern France.

Between 1974 and 2007 Kirrwiller-Bosselshausen was a single commune, but in January 2007, Bosselshausen and Kirrwiller communes were separated.

Kirrwiller is known for its cabaret, the Royal Palace.

See also
 Communes of the Bas-Rhin department

References

Communes of Bas-Rhin
Bas-Rhin communes articles needing translation from French Wikipedia
Populated places established in 2007